Gael Turnbull (7 April 1928 – 2 July 2004) was a Scottish poet who was an important figure in the British Poetry Revival of the 1960s and 1970s.

Biography
Turnbull was born in Edinburgh and grew up in Northern England and in Canada, where he moved with his parents at the beginning of World War II. He studied Natural Sciences at Christ's College, Cambridge, and graduated in Medicine from the University of Pennsylvania in 1951. As a doctor and anesthetist, he worked in Ontario; London, England; Ventura, California; Worcester; and Barrow-in-Furness.

His poetry first appeared in a book in Canada in 1954. Trio, an anthology of poems by Turnbull, Eli Mandel and Phyllis Webb, was published by Raymond Souster's Contact Press. His poems also appeared in Origin, Cid Corman's magazine.

In 1957, Turnbull started Migrant Press, one of the first British-run presses to focus on poets in the modernist tradition. His work was featured in the groundbreaking Revival anthology Children of Albion: Poetry of the Underground in Britain (1969). His own books include A Gathering of Poems 1950-1980 (1983) and Rattle of Scree: Poems (1997). He was also published in the anthologies The New British Poetry (1988), Other: British and Irish Poetry since 1970 (1999) and Anthology of Twentieth-Century British and Irish Poetry (2001).

He returned to Edinburgh after he retired from medical practice in 1989. In this city, he worked on what he termed kinetic poems; texts for installation in which the movement of the reader and/or of the text became part of the reading experience. He died on a visit to Herefordshire of a sudden brain hemorrhage.

In 2006, Turnbull's collected poems, There Are Words, were published by Shearsman Books.

Selected bibliography
 Trio: First Poems by Gael Turnbull, Phyllis Webb, and Eli Mandel, with Phyllis Webb and Eli Mandel. Toronto: Contact Press (1954).
 If a Glance Could Be Enough. 16 pages. SATIS (Malcolm Rutherford) (1978). 
 A Gathering of Poems 1950-1980. Anvil Press Poetry Ltd (1983). 
 Circus, edited by Pamela Scott. Limited signed ed (50) edition (December 1984). IBN 0951085409
 From the Language of the Heart: Some Imitations from the Gaelic of Sine Reisideach. Gnomon Distribution, 1985. 
 While Breath Persist. 160 pages. Porcupine's Quill (1991).  
 To the Tune of Annie Laurie: Poems. 16 pages. Akros Publications (April 1995). 
 Helen Macdonald/Gael Turnbull/Nicholas Johnson by Helen Macdonald, Gael Turnbull and Nicholas Johnson. 118 pages. Etruscan Books (January 1997). 
 Rattle of Scree: Poems. 20 pages. Akros Publications (Oct 1997). 
 Transmutations. 23 pages. Shoestring Press (October 1998). 
 A Perception of Ferns, illustrated by Raine Clarke. 16 pages. Essence Press (Sept. 2003). 
 The Storey's Story: Memories, Stories, Poems, Images, with Rodge Glass and Jacob Polley, edited by Rodge Glass. Lancaster Litfest Publications (November, 2004).  
 There Are Words: Collected Poems. 496 pages. Shearsman Books (2006)  
 More Words: Gael Turnbull on Poets & Poetry. 204 pages. Edited by Jill Turnbull and Hamish White. Shearsman Books (15 September 2012). Reviews, essays, memoirs and journal pieces. Introduction by Jill Turnbull.

References

External links 
 Gael Turnbull at the BEPC
 Obituary
 Ron Silliman on the work of Gael Turnbull Ron Silliman discusses the work of Turnbull, particularly There Are Words: Collected Poems, on his popular weblog
 Gael Turnbull Letters to Cid Corman and Miscellaneous Papers MSS 45. Special Collections & Archives, UC San Diego Library.
 Records of Gael Turnbull are held by Simon Fraser University's Special Collections and Rare Books
 Finding aid to Gael Turnbull letters, 1956-1969, at Columbia University. Rare Book & Manuscript Library.
 Archives of Gael Turbull (Gael Turnbull fonds, R11823) are held at Library and Archives Canada. Fonds consists of correspondence

1928 births
2004 deaths
Alumni of Christ's College, Cambridge
Perelman School of Medicine at the University of Pennsylvania alumni
British Poetry Revival
Writers from Edinburgh
20th-century Scottish poets
Scottish male poets
20th-century British male writers
21st-century British male writers
Medical doctors from Edinburgh